Maylandia aurora is a species of cichlid endemic to Lake Malawi where it is only known from the southern half of Likoma Island where it prefers habitats with rocky substrates close to sand.  Males of this species can reach a length of  SL while females reach  SL.  It is also found in the aquarium trade.

References

aurora
Fish described in 1976
Taxonomy articles created by Polbot
Taxobox binomials not recognized by IUCN